Ida Sofi Emilia Flink (born 8 July 1995) is a Swedish track and field athlete who competes in the javelin throw. Her personal best throw of 61.96 m is the Swedish women's record.

Career
Flink won silver at her first international competition, the 2011 World Youth Championships. In 2012, she won gold at the World Junior Championships. In July 2013, she won gold at the European Junior Championships. The next month she competed at the 2013 World Championships, her first senior international competition. She set a personal best and Swedish record of 61.96 m to advance through the qualification round then finished tenth in the final with a 59.52 m throw.

In July 2014, Flink sought to defend her title at the World Junior Championships. She ultimately finished second, losing her title to Ekaterina Starygina. In August, she competed at the 2014 European Championships, where she made it through the qualification round and finished twelfth in the final.

Flink next competed at the 2016 European Championships. She finished twenty-third in the qualification round and did not advance to the final. She participated in the 2017 European U23 Championships, where she failed to register a valid throw in the qualifiers.

Competition record

References

External links

1995 births
Living people
People from Hallstahammar Municipality
Swedish female javelin throwers
Sportspeople from Västmanland County